Chupkaornis is a genus of prehistoric flightless birds from the Late Cretaceous (Coniacian-Santonian) Kashima Formation of Hokkaido, Japan.

Description
Diagnostic traits of Chupkaornis include a finger-like projected tibiofibular crest of femur, deep, emarginated lateral excavation with a sharply defined edge of the ventral margin of the thoracic vertebrae, and the heterocoelous articular surface of the thoracic vertebrae.

Phylogeny
Chupkaornis is recovered by Tanaka et al. (2017) as more derived than the Cenomanian-age form Pasquiaornis, but less advanced than Brodavis and Baptornis.

References

Bird genera
Extinct flightless birds
Fossil taxa described in 2017
Hesperornitheans
Late Cretaceous birds of Asia